Roepkiella thaika is a moth in the family Cossidae. It was described by Yakovlev in 2006. It is found in southern Thailand and Vietnam.

The length of the forewings is about 10 mm. The apical and submarginal areas of the forewings are white, crossed by several wavy brown lines. The rest of the wing is light brown. The hindwings are grey with brown veins.

Etymology
The species name is derived from Russian thaika (meaning a Thai woman).

References

Natural History Museum Lepidoptera generic names catalog

Cossinae
Moths described in 2006